Jean Assaad Haddad (17 December 1926 – 22 January 2021) was a Lebanese Melkite hierarch, who served as an Archbishop of the Melkite Greek Catholic Archeparchy of Tyre in Lebanon.

Life
Haddad was born in December 1926 in Beit Chabab, Lebanon. On 2 July 1950, he received his priestly ordination. On 26 October 1988 he became  successor to Archbishop Georges Haddad as Archbishop of Tyre. The Patriarch of Antioch Maximos V Hakim consecrated him bishop on 27 November 1988, and his co-consecrators were the Archbishops Grégoire Haddad as Titular Archbishop of Adana of Greek Melkites and Habib Bacha, SMSP of Beirut and Byblos.

In 2000, Haddad from 6 June to 29 November became apostolic administrator "sede plena" of the Melkite Patriarchate of Antioch. On 20 June 2005 he became emeritus bishop due to age-related reasons, and was succeeded by Georges Bacouni, whom he co-consecrated. He also served as co-consecrator of the Archbishops Boutros Mouallem, MSP of São Paulo in Brazil and Joseph Kallas of Beirut and Byblos.

References

External links
 http://www.catholic-hierarchy.org/bishop/bhaddadja.html

1926 births
2021 deaths
Lebanese Melkite Greek Catholics
Melkite Greek Catholic bishops
People from Matn District